Vyacheslav Buravchikov (born May 22, 1987) is a Russian former professional ice hockey defenceman. He played for HC Atlant Moscow, Ak Bars Kazan and HC CSKA Moscow. He was drafted 191st overall in the 2005 NHL Entry Draft by the Buffalo Sabres of the National Hockey League (NHL).

On December 24, 2010, he was traded to HC CSKA Moscow for defenceman Konstantin Korneyev and a financial compensation. In 2013, Buravchikov took time out from hockey because of a heart problem.

Career statistics

Regular season and playoffs

International

External links

 Vyacheslav Buravchikov at RussianProspects.com

1987 births
Living people
Ak Bars Kazan players
Buffalo Sabres draft picks
Atlant Moscow Oblast players
HC CSKA Moscow players
Russian ice hockey defencemen
Ice hockey people from Moscow